Mirzəhəsənli (also, Mirzə Həsənli and Mirzahasanli) is a village in the Zangilan Rayon of Azerbaijan.

References 

Populated places in Zangilan District